Siobhan Freegard OBE (born 17 July 1967) is an entrepreneur and parenting commentator.  She founded her first business, Netmums, in 2000 and grew it to become the biggest parenting website in the UK with a unique network of 151 local websites and 300 national groups for mums to meet offline, alongside 2,300 parent bloggers and over 8 million unique users each month.

She is the author of the book How to be a Happy Mum, published by Headline. Headline published six other Netmums parenting books under Freegard's guidance.

In 2011 Freegard and her co-founders sold Netmums to Axel Springer-owned French women’s publisher Aufeminin but she remained as Managing Director.  In March 2014 Freegard estimated that the business was worth £50 million. In September 2014 Freegard stepped down as Managing Director to start a new content company for mothers, called Channel Mum.

She was awarded an OBE in the 2013 New Years Honours List for services to families, which was presented to her in March 2014 at Buckingham Palace by Prince William.

Personal life  
Freegard has spoken publicly about the postnatal depression that she experienced after the birth of her first child, and has campaigned publicly for better support and understanding for mums with postnatal depression.

References

Living people
1967 births
English women in business
Officers of the Order of the British Empire